Gompholobium glutinosum is a species of flowering plant in the family Fabaceae and is endemic to the far west of Western Australia. It is an erect, openly-branched shrub with pinnate leaves with three to five leaflets, and yellow and red, pea-like flowers.

Description
Flowering occurs from September to October and the fruit is a pod.

Taxonomy
Gompholobium glutinosum was first formally described in 2008 by Jennifer Anne Chappill in Australian Systematic Botany from specimens collected near Kalbarri in 1979. The specific epithet (glutinosum) means "sticky" or "glutinous", referring to the foliage of this species.

Distribution and habitat
This pea grows on valleys, hills and plains in the Avon Wheatbelt and Geraldton Sandplains biogeographic regions in the far west of Western Australia.

Conservation status
Gompholobium glutinosum is classified as "not threatened" by the Government of Western Australia Department of Parks and Wildlife.

References

glutinosum
Eudicots of Western Australia
Plants described in 2008